Abigail L. S. Swann is an Associate Professor of Atmospheric Sciences and Ecology at the University of Washington. Her research group focuses on questions that examine the interactions between plants and climate.

Early life and education 
Swann grew up in Glen Ellen, CA and now resides in Seattle, WA. She received her bachelor's degree in earth and planetary sciences at the University of California, Berkeley. She then attended Columbia University for her master's degree in earth and environmental sciences. She returned to the University of California, Berkeley to complete her Ph.D. Her thesis advisor was Inez Fung.

She was also a competitive youth and collegiate sailor, winning the US Sailing Junior Women's Doublehanded Championship (Ida Lewis Trophy) and the collegiate sailing Robert Hobbes Sportsmanship Award.

Career and research 
Swann is an Associate Professor of Atmospheric Science and Ecology at the University of Washington. She uses climate models to simulate the way that plants influence earth's climate. She has made a number of discoveries about how changes in the biosphere may influence our climate. For example, she predicts that the addition of deciduous forests in the Arctic may cause warming both by reducing the amount of area covered by reflective ice and by increasing the amount of water vapor in the atmosphere through evapotranspiration. While additional forests in mid latitudes across North America and Eurasia, may influence forests as far away as the tropics. Her group also examines how plants adapt to shifts in climate. For example, she found that plants use less water as CO2 increases, decreasing the severity of drought response and thus changing the way climate models should be built. Her findings on the influence of plants on the environment have been reported by Quanta Magazine, Geographical Magazine, Inside Science, and multiple UW News publications.

Swann serves as a co-chair of the Biogeochemistry Working Group, Community Earth System Model, and National Center for Atmospheric Research.

Notable publications

Awards and honors  

 American Geophysical Union Global Environmental Change Early Career Award, 2019 
 Ecological Society of America Early Career Fellow, 2019 
 Science News 10 Scientists to Watch, 2019 
 Jon C. Graff, Ph.D. Prize for Excellence in Science Communications, 2019
 Kavli Frontiers of Science Fellow, 2018
 National Science Foundation CAREER Faculty Early Career Development Award, 2016
 DISCCRS VI Scholar, 2011
 Giorgio Ruffolo Post-Doctoral fellow in Sustainability Science, 2010

See also
Greenhouse effect
Afforestation
Effects of climate change on plant biodiversity

References  

Year of birth missing (living people)
Living people
University of California, Berkeley alumni
Columbia University alumni
University of Washington faculty
Academics from California